One Day International (ODI) cricket is played between international cricket teams who are Full Members of the International Cricket Council (ICC) as well as the top four Associate members. Unlike Test matches, ODIs consist of one inning per team, having a limit in the number of overs, currently 50 overs per innings – although in the past this has been 55 or 60 overs. ODI cricket is List-A cricket, so statistics and records set in ODI matches also count toward List-A records. The earliest match recognised as an ODI was played between England and Australia in January 1971; since when there have been over 4,000 ODIs played by 28 teams. 
This is a list of Afghanistan Cricket team's One Day International records. It is based on the List of One Day International cricket records, but concentrates solely on records dealing with the Afghanistan cricket team. Afghanistan played its first ever ODI in 2009 against Scotland.

Key
The top five records are listed for each category, except for the team wins, losses, draws and ties, all round records and the partnership records. Tied records for fifth place are also included. Explanations of the general symbols and cricketing terms used in the list are given below. Specific details are provided in each category where appropriate. All records include matches played for Afghanistan only, and are correct .

Team records

Overall Record

Team wins, losses, draws and ties 
, Afghanistan has played 129 ODI matches resulting in 62 victories, 63 defeats 1 tie and 3 no results for an overall winning percentage of 49.60.

First bilateral ODI series wins

First ODI match wins

Winning every match in a series 
In a bilateral series winning all matches is referred to as whitewash. First such event occurred when West Indies toured England in 1976. Afghanistan has not won any such ODI series till now.

Losing every match in a series 
Afghanistan have suffered such whitewash once.

Team scoring records

Most runs in an innings
The highest innings total scored in ODIs came in the match between England and Australia in June 2018. Playing in the third ODI at Trent Bridge in Nottingham, the hosts posted a total of 481/6. The second ODI of the 2017 series against Ireland saw Afghanistan set their highest innings total of 338.

Fewest runs in an innings
The lowest innings total scored in ODIs has been scored twice. Zimbabwe were dismissed for 35 by Sri Lanka during the third ODI in Sri Lanka's tour of Zimbabwe in April 2004 and USA were dismissed for same score by Nepal in the sixth ODI of the 2020 ICC ICC Cricket World League 2 in Nepal in February 2020. The lowest score in ODI history for Afghanistan is 58 scored in their third ODI of the 2016 series against Zimbabwe, which is joint 14th lowest of all time.

Most runs conceded an innings
Afghanistan's World Cup game against the Australia saw them concede their highest innings total of 417/6.

Fewest runs conceded in an innings
The lowest score conceded by Afghansitan for a full inning is 54 scored by Zimbabwe in the fifth ODI of the 2017 series.

Most runs aggregate in a match
The highest match aggregate scored in ODIs came in the match between South Africa and Australia in the fifth ODI of March 2006 series at Wanderers Stadium, Johannesburg when South Africa scored 438/9 in response to Australia's 434/4. 
Afghanistan's 2019 Cricket World Cup game against England in Old Trafford, Manchester saw a total of 644 runs being scored.

Fewest runs aggregate in a match
The lowest match aggregate in ODIs is 71 when USA were dismissed for 35 by Nepal in the sixth ODI of the 2020 ICC ICC Cricket World League 2 in Nepal in February 2020. The lowest match aggregate in ODI history for Afghanistan is 184 scored in the 55th match of the 2011–13 ICC World Cricket League Championship against Kenya.

Result records
An ODI match is won when one side has scored more runs than the total runs scored by the opposing side during their innings. If both sides have completed both their allocated innings and the side that fielded last has the higher aggregate of runs, it is known as a win by runs. This indicates the number of runs that they had scored more than the opposing side. If the side batting last wins the match, it is known as a win by wickets, indicating the number of wickets that were still to fall.

Greatest win margins (by runs)
The greatest winning margin by runs in ODIs was New Zealand's victory over Ireland by 290 runs in the only ODI of the 2008 England tour. The largest victory recorded by Afghanistan is during the 2018 series by 154 runs against Zimbabwe.

Greatest win margins (by balls remaining)
The greatest winning margin by balls remaining in ODIs was England's victory over Canada by 8 wickets with 277 balls remaining in the 1979 Cricket World Cup. The largest victory recorded by Afghanistan, is during the 2013 Series against Kenya when they won by 8 wickets with 193 balls remaining.

Greatest win margins (by wickets)
A total of 55 matches have ended with chasing team winning by 10 wickets with West Indies winning by such margins a record 10 times. Afghanistan have won an ODI match by a margin of 10 wickets only once.

Highest successful run chases
South Africa holds the record for the highest successful run chase which they achieved when they scored 438/9 in response to Australia's 434/9. Afghanistan's highest innings total while chasing is 276/8 in a successful run chase against UAE at Dubai in December 2014.

Narrowest win margins (by runs)
The narrowest run margin victory is by 1 run which has been achieved in 31 ODI's with Australia winning such games a record 6 times. Afghanistan's has achieved victory by 1 run once.

Narrowest win margins (by balls remaining)
The narrowest winning margin by balls remaining in ODIs is by winning of the last ball which has been achieved 36 times with both South Africa winning seven times. Afghanistan has achieved victory by this margin only once when they defeated Kenya during the 2010 ICC World Cricket League Division One in Amstelveen in July 2010.

Narrowest win margins (by wickets)
The narrowest margin of victory by wickets is 1 wicket which has settled 55 such ODIs. Both West Indies and New Zealand have recorded such victory on eight occasions. Afghanistan has won the match by a margin of one wicket on two occasions.

Greatest loss margins (by runs)
Afghanistan's biggest defeat by runs was against Australia in the 2015 Cricket World Cup game at the WACA, Perth.

Greatest loss margins (by balls remaining)
The greatest winning margin by balls remaining in ODIs was England's victory over Canada by 8 wickets with 277 balls remaining in the 1979 Cricket World Cup. The largest defeat suffered by Afghanistan was against Zimbabwe in Zimbabwe when they lost by 8 wickets with 160 balls remaining.

Greatest loss margins (by wickets)
Afghanistan have never lost an ODI match by a margin of 10 wickets.

Narrowest loss margins (by runs)
The narrowest loss of Afghanistan in terms of runs is by 2 run against Zimbabwe in March 2018.

Narrowest loss margins (by balls remaining)
The narrowest winning margin by balls remaining in ODIs is by winning of the last ball which has been achieved 36 times with both South Africa winning seven times. Afghanistan has not suffered any such loss by this margin.

Narrowest loss margins (by wickets)
Narrowest defeat suffered by Afghanistan is by 2 wickets against Scotland in July 2010 during the 2010 ICC World Cricket League Division One.

Tied matches 
A tie can occur when the scores of both teams are equal at the conclusion of play, provided that the side batting last has completed their innings. 
There have been 37 ties in ODIs history with Afghanistan involved in only one such games.

Individual records

Batting records

Most career runs

A run is the basic means of scoring in cricket.
India's Sachin Tendulkar has scored the most runs in ODIs with 18,246. Second is Kumar Sangakkara of Sri Lanka with 14,234 ahead of Ricky Ponting from Australia in third with 13,704. Afghanistan's Mohammad Nabi is the leading scorer for Afghanistan.

Fastest runs getter

Most runs in each batting position

Highest individual score
The fourth ODI of the Sri Lanka's tour of India in 2014 saw Rohit Sharma score the highest individual score.
Mohammad Shahzad holds the Afghanistan's record for highest individual score.

Highest individual score – progression of record

Highest score against each opponent

Highest career average
A batsman's batting average is the total number of runs they have scored divided by the number of times they have been dismissed.

Highest Average in each batting position

Most half-centuries
A half-century is a score of between 50 and 99 runs. Statistically, once a batsman's score reaches 100, it is no longer considered a half-century but a century.
Sachin Tendulkar of India has scored the most half-centuries in ODIs with 96. He is followed by the Sri Lanka's Kumar Sangakkara on 93, South Africa's Jacques Kallis on 86 and Afghanistan's Rahul Dravid and Pakistan's Inzamam-ul-Haq on 83. Rahmat Shah and Mohammad Shahzad hold the Afghanistan's record for most fifties.

Most centuries
A century is a score of 100 or more runs in a single innings.

Tendulkar has also scored the most centuries in ODIs with 49. Mohammad Shahzad has scored the most centuries for Afghanistan.

Most Sixes

Most Fours

Highest strike rates
Andre Russell of West Indies holds the record for highest strike rate, with minimum 500 balls faced qualification, with 130.22. Rashid Khan is the Afghanistan batsmen with the highest strike rate.

Highest strike rates in an inning
James Franklin of New Zealand's strike rate of 387.50 during his 31* off 8 balls against Canada during 2011 Cricket World Cup is the world record for highest strike rate in an innings. Rashid Khan is the highest rated Afghani on this list.

Most runs in a calendar year
Tendulkar holds the record for most runs scored in a calendar year with 1894 runs scored in 1998. Rahmat Shah holds the Afghan record with 722 runs in 2018.

Most runs in a series
The 1980-81 Benson & Hedges World Series Cup in Australia saw Greg Chappell set the record for the most runs scored in a single series scoring 685 runs. He is followed by Sachin Tendulkar with 673 runs scored in the 2003 Cricket World Cup. Nawroz Mangal with 306 runs in the 2011–13 ICC World Cricket League Championship holds the Afghani record.

Most ducks
A duck refers to a batsman being dismissed without scoring a run. 
Sanath Jayasuriya has scored the equal highest number of ducks in ODIs with 34 such knocks. Mujeeb ur Rahman, Dawlat Zadran and Asghar Afghan share the dubious record for Afghanistan.

Bowling records

Most career wickets
A bowler takes the wicket of a batsman when the form of dismissal is bowled, caught, leg before wicket, stumped or hit wicket. If the batsman is dismissed by run out, obstructing the field, handling the ball, hitting the ball twice or timed out the bowler does not receive credit.

Rashid Khan is the highest wicket taker for Afghanistan.

Fastest wicket taker

Best figures in an innings
Bowling figures refers to the number of the wickets a bowler has taken and the number of runs conceded.
Sri Lanka's Chaminda Vaas holds the world record for best figures in an innings when he took 8/19 against Zimbabwe in December 2001 at Colombo (SSC). Rashid Khan holds the Afghanistan record for best bowling figures.

Best figures in an innings – progression of record

Best Bowling Figure against each opponent
{| class="wikitable sortable" 
|- 
! Opposition !! Player !! Figures !! Date
|-
||  || Karim Sadiq || 2/22 || 
|-
||  || Dawlat Zadran || 4/73 || 
|-
|rowspan=2| || Samiullah Shinwari ||rowspan=2|4/31 || 
|-
|| Mohammad Nabi || 
|-
||  || Gulbadin Naib || 3/68 ||  
|-
||  || Mujeeb Ur Rahman  || 3/26 || 
|-
||  || Mohammad Nabi || 2/33 ||  
|-
|rowspan=2| || Rashid Khan||rowspan=2|6/43 || 
|-
|| Gulbadin Naib || 
|-
||  || Hamid Hassan || 4/19 || 
|-
||  || Shapoor Zadran || 4/24 || 
|-
||  || Aftab Alam || 3/45 ||  
|-
||  || Rashid Khan|| 3/46 || 
|-
||  || Gulbadin Naib || 4/31 || 
|-
||  || Gulbadin Naib || 1/29 ||  
|-
||  || Mohammad Nabi || 4/30 ||  
|-
||  || Rahmat Shah || 5/32 || 
|-
||  ||rowspan=2|Rashid Khan|| 7/18 || 
|-
||  || 5/24 || 
|-
|- class=sortbottom
| colspan=5 | <small>Last updated: 1 March 2020.</small>
|}

Best career average
A bowler's bowling average is the total number of runs they have conceded divided by the number of wickets they have taken.
Afghanistan's Rashid Khan holds the record for the best career average in ODIs with 18.54. Joel Garner, West Indian cricketer, and a member of the highly regarded late 1970s and early 1980s West Indies cricket teams, is second behind Rashid with an overall career average of 18.84 runs per wicket.

Best career economy rate
A bowler's economy rate is the total number of runs they have conceded divided by the number of overs they have bowled.
West Indies' Joel Garner, holds the ODI record for the best career economy rate with 3.09. Afghanistan's Mujeeb Ur Rahman, with a rate of 3.94 runs per over conceded over his 40-match ODI career, is the highest Afghanistan on the list.

Best career strike rate
A bowler's strike rate is the total number of balls they have bowled divided by the number of wickets they have taken.
The top bowler with the best ODI career strike rate is South Africa's Lungi Ngidi with strike rate of 23.2 balls per wicket. Rashid Khan is at 7th position in this list.

Most four-wickets (& over) hauls in an innings
Rashid Khan is the highest rated Afghani bowler on the list of most four-wicket hauls with Pakistan's Waqar Younis, Sri Lanka's Muttiah Muralitharan and Australia's Brett Lee leading this list in ODIs.

Most five-wicket hauls in a match
A five-wicket haul refers to a bowler taking five wickets in a single innings.
Rashid Khan is the highest ranked Afghanistan on the list of most five-wicket hauls which is headed by Pakistan's Waqar Younis with 13 such hauls.

Best economy rates in an inning
The best economy rate in an inning, when a minimum of 30 balls are delivered by the player, is by West Indies player Phil Simmons economy of 0.30 during his spell of 3 runs for 4 wickets in 10 overs against Pakistan at Sydney Cricket Ground in the 1991–92 Australian Tri-Series. Nabi holds the Afghanistan record during his spell in against Kenya at Sharjah.

Best strike rates in an inning
The best strike rate in an inning, when a minimum of 4 wickets are taken by the player, is shared by Sunil Dhaniram of Canada, Paul Collingwood of England and Virender Sehwag of India when they achieved a strike rate of 4.2 balls per wicket. Rahmat Shah holds the Afghan record with a strike rate of 6.6 against UAE in May 2014 during the 2014 ACC Premier League in Malaysia.

Worst figures in an innings
The worst figures in an ODI came in the 5th One Day International between South Africa at home to Australia in 2006. Australia's Mick Lewis returned figures of 0/113 from his 10 overs in the second innings of the match. The worst figures by an Afghanistan is 0/108 that came off the bowling of Rashid Khan in the 2019 Cricket World Cup against England.

Most runs conceded in a match
Mick Lewis also holds the dubious distinction of most runs conceded in an ODI during the aforementioned match. The Afghanistan record in ODIs is held by Rashid Khan in the aforementioned World Cup game in 2019.

Most wickets in a calendar year
Pakistan's Saqlain Mushtaq holds the record for most wickets taken in a year when he took 69 wickets in 1997 in 36 ODIs. Afghanistan's Rashid Khan is joint-21st on the list having taken 48 wickets in 2018.

Most wickets in a series
1998–99 Carlton and United Series involving Australia, England and Sri Lanka and the 2019 Cricket World Cup saw the records set for the most wickets taken by a bowler in an ODI series when Australian pacemen Glenn McGrath and Mitchell Starc achieved a total of 27 wickets during the series, respectively. Afghanistan's Rashid Khan, twice, and Mujeeb Ur Rahman have taken 16 wickets in a series, which is the most for an Afghan bowler.

Wicket-keeping records
The wicket-keeper is a specialist fielder who stands behind the stumps being guarded by the batsman on strike and is the only member of the fielding side allowed to wear gloves and leg pads.

Most career dismissals
A wicket-keeper can be credited with the dismissal of a batsman in two ways, caught or stumped. A fair catch is taken when the ball is caught fully within the field of play without it bouncing after the ball has touched the striker's bat or glove holding the bat, Laws 5.6.2.2 and 5.6.2.3 state that the hand or the glove holding the bat shall be regarded as the ball striking or touching the bat while a stumping occurs when the wicket-keeper puts down the wicket while the batsman is out of his ground and not attempting a run.
Afghanistan's Mohammad Shahzad is joint 35th in taking most dismissals in ODIs as a designated wicket-keeper.

Most career catches
Shahzad is the highest ranked Afghan wicket-keeper in taking most catches in ODIs as a designated wicket-keeper.

Most career stumpings
Dhoni holds the record for the most stumpings in ODIs with 123 followed by Sri Lankans Sangakkara and Romesh Kaluwitharana.

Most dismissals in an innings
Ten wicket-keepers on 15 occasions have taken six dismissals in a single innings in an ODI. Adam Gilchrist of Australia alone has done it six times. No Afghan wicket keeper has so far achieved this.

The feat of taking 5 dismissals in an innings has been achieved by 49 wicket-keepers on 87 occasions including Mohommad Shahzad once.

Most dismissals in a series
Gilchrist also holds the ODIs record for the most dismissals taken by a wicket-keeper in a series. He made 27 dismissals during the 1998-99 Carlton & United Series. Afghanistan record is held by Mohammad Shahzad when he made 13 dismissals during the 2011–13 ICC World Cricket League Championship.

Fielding records

Most career catches

Caught is one of the nine methods a batsman can be dismissed in cricket.  The majority of catches are caught in the slips, located behind the batsman, next to the wicket-keeper, on the off side of the field. Most slip fielders are top order batsmen.

Sri Lanka's Mahela Jayawardene holds the record for the most catches in ODIs by a non-wicket-keeper with 218, followed by Ricky Ponting of Australia on 160 and India's Mohammad Azharuddin with 156.MOhammad Nabi holds the Afghan record with 55 catches.

Most catches in an innings
South Africa's Jonty Rhodes is the only fielder to have taken five catches in an innings.

The feat of taking 4 catches in an innings has been achieved by 42 fielders on 44 occasions but no one from Afghanistan.

Most catches in a series
The 2019 Cricket World Cup, which was won by England for the first time, saw the record set for the most catches taken by a non-wicket-keeper in an ODI series. Englishman batsman and captain of the England Test team Joe Root took 13 catches in the series as well as scored 556 runs. Afghanistan's Najibullah Zadran is the leading Afghan fielder in this list with 8 catches taken during the 2018 ICC Cricket World Cup Qualifier.

All-round Records
1000 runs and 100 wickets
A total of 64 players have achieved the double of 1000 runs and 100 wickets in their ODI career.

250 runs and 5 wickets in a series
A total of 50 players on 103 occasions have achieved the double of 250 runs and 5 wickets in a series.

Other records
Most career matches
India's Sachin Tendulkar holds the record for the most ODI matches played with 463, with former captains Mahela Jayawardene and Sanath Jayasuriya being second and third having represented Sri Lanka on 443 and 441 occasions, respectively. Mohammad Nabi is the most experienced Afghan player.

Most consecutive career matches
Tendulkar also holds the record for the most consecutive ODI matches played with 185. He broke Richie Richardson's long standing record of 132 matches.

Most matches as captain

Ricky Ponting, who led the Australian cricket team from 2002 to 2012, holds the record for the most matches played as captain in ODIs with 230 (including 1 as captain of ICC World XI team).Asghar Afghan, the current skipper, has led Afghansitan team the most number of times.

Youngest players on Debut
The youngest player to play in an ODI match is claimed to be Hasan Raza at the age of 14 years and 233 days. Making his debut for Pakistan against Zimbabwe on 30 October 1996, there is some doubt as to the validity of Raza's age at the time. The youngest Afghanistan to play ODIs is Mujeeb Ur Rahman who at the age of 16 years and 252 days debuted in the first ODI of the series against Ireland in December 2017.

Partnership records
In cricket, two batsmen are always present at the crease batting together in a partnership. This partnership will continue until one of them is dismissed, retires or the innings comes to a close.

Highest partnerships by wicket
A wicket partnership describes the number of runs scored before each wicket falls. The first wicket partnership is between the opening batsmen and continues until the first wicket falls. The second wicket partnership then commences between the not out batsman and the number three batsman. This partnership continues until the second wicket falls. The third wicket partnership then commences between the not out batsman and the new batsman. This continues down to the tenth wicket partnership. When the tenth wicket has fallen, there is no batsman left to partner so the innings is closed.

Highest partnerships by runs
The highest ODI partnership by runs for any wicket is held by the West Indian pairing of Chris Gayle and Marlon Samuels who put together a second wicket partnership of 372 runs during the 2015 Cricket World Cup against Zimbabwe in February 2015. This broke the record of 331 runs set by Indian pair of Sachin Tendulkar and Rahul Dravid against New Zealand in 1999

Umpiring records
Most matches umpired
An umpire in cricket is a person who officiates the match according to the Laws of Cricket''. Two umpires adjudicate the match on the field, whilst a third umpire has access to video replays, and a fourth umpire looks after the match balls and other duties. The records below are only for on-field umpires.

Rudi Koertzen of South Africa holds the record for the most ODI matches umpired with 209. The current active Aleem Dar is currently at 208 matches. They are followed by New Zealand's Billy Bowden who officiated in 200 matches. The most experienced Afghanistan umpire is Ahmed Shah Pakteen who has stood in 12 ODI matches.

See also

List of One Day International cricket records
List of Afghanistan Test cricket records
List of Afghanistan Twenty20 International cricket records

Notes

References

One Day International cricket records
One Day